The women's slalom at the 2007 Asian Winter Games was held on 2 February 2007 at Beida Lake Skiing Resort, China.

Schedule
All times are China Standard Time (UTC+08:00)

Results
Legend
DNF — Did not finish
DSQ — Disqualified

References

Results
Results

External links
Official website

Women slalom